The men's high jump event  at the 1989 European Athletics Indoor Championships was held on 19 February.

Results

References

High jump at the European Athletics Indoor Championships
High